The 2003 Formula Renault 2.0 UK Championship was the 15th British Formula Renault Championship. The season began at Snetterton on 19 April and ended on 21 September at Oulton Park, after seventeen rounds held in England, with 5 events only staging one race and the rest staging two.

Main Series

Teams and drivers

Race calendar and results

Drivers' Championship

 Points were awarded on a 32-28-25-22-20-18-16-14-12-11-10-9-8-7-6-5-4-3-2-1 basis, with 1 point for fastest lap. A driver's 15 best results counted towards the championship.

Winter Series

Teams and drivers

Race calendar and results

Drivers' Championship

External links
 The official website of the Formula Renault UK Championship

UK
Formula Renault UK season
Renault 2.0 UK